Physicians in the United States are doctors who practice medicine for the human body. They are an important part of health care in the United States. The vast majority of physicians in the US have a Doctor of Medicine (MD) degree, though some have a Doctor of Osteopathic Medicine (DO) or Bachelor of Medicine, Bachelor of Surgery (MBBS).

The American College of Physicians, uses the term physician to describe specialists in internal medicine, while the American Medical Association uses the term physician to describe members of all specialties.

Trends related to a physician shortage in the U.S. have generated discussion by the American news media in publications such as Forbes, The Nation, and Newsweek.

Working conditions 
Doctors may work independently, as part of a larger group practice, or for a hospital or healthcare organization. Independent practices are defined as one in which the physician owns a majority of his or her practice and has decision making rights. In 2000, 57% of doctors were independent, but this decreased to 33% by 2016. Between 2012 and 2015, there was a 50% increase in the number of physicians employed by hospitals.  26 percent have opted out of seeing patients with Medicaid and 15 percent have opted out of seeing patients with health insurance exchange plans.

On average, physicians in the US work 55 hours each week and earn a salary of $270,000, although work hours and compensation vary by specialty. 25% of physicians work more than 60 hours per week.

Demographics 
While an impending "doctor shortage" has been reported, from 2010 to 2018, the actively licensed U.S. physician-to-population ratio increased from 277 to 301 physicians per 100,000 people. Additionally, the number of female physicians, and osteopathic and Caribbean graduates have increased at a greater percentage.
 

As of 2018, there were over 985,000 practicing physicians in the United States. 90.6% have an MD degree, and 76% were educated in the United States. 64% were male. 82% were licensed in a medical specialty. 22% held active licenses in two or more states. The percentage of females skews younger. In 2018, 33% of female physicians were under 40 years old, compared with 19% of male physicians. The District of Columbia has, by far, the largest number of physicians as a percentage of the population, with 1,639 per 100,000 people. Additionally, Among active physicians, 56.2% identified as White, 17.1% identified as Asian, 5.8% identified as Hispanic, and 5.0% identified as Black.

Specialists
The term, hospitalist, was introduced in 1996, to describe US specialists in internal medicine who work largely or exclusively in hospitals. Such 'hospitalists' now make up about 19% of all US  general internists.

There are three agencies or organizations in the United States which collectively oversee physician board certification of medical and osteopathic physicians in the United States in the 26 approved medical specialties recognized in the country. These organizations are the American Board of Medical Specialties and the American Medical Association; the American Osteopathic Association Bureau of Osteopathic Specialists and the American Osteopathic Association; the American Board of Physician Specialties and the American Association of Physician Specialists. Each of these agencies and their associated national medical organization functions as its various specialty academies, colleges, and societies.

All boards of certification now require that medical practitioners demonstrate, by examination, continuing mastery of the core knowledge and skills for a chosen specialty. Recertification varies by particular specialty between every eight and ten years.

Salaries

Pay Gap by gender and race
The average salary for white male physicians was $253,000 compared with $188,230 for black male physicians, $163,000 for white female physicians, and $153,000 for black female physicians.

Medscape’s 2019 Physician Compensation Report found that "males out-earned their female counterparts in both primary care and specialist positions with men earning 25% and 33% more, respectively."

The AMA has advocated to reduce gender bias and close the pay gap.
The AMA said that  “significant sex differences in salary exist even after accounting for age, experience, specialty, faculty rank, and measures of research productivity and clinical revenue.”
A 2015 study of gender pay disparities among hospitalists found that women were more likely to be working night shifts despite having lower salaries. In 2018, the AMA delegates advocated for transparency in defining the criteria for initial and subsequent physician compensation,  that pay structures be based on objective, gender-neutral objective criteria, and that institutes take a specified approach using metrics for all employees to identify gender disparity.

The AMA has also advocated to move USMLE Step 1 to pass/fail to decrease racial bias. A 2020 study showed lack of diversity within specialities and that that underrepresented students were more likely to go into specialities that have lower Step 1 cut offs like Primary Care.

Pay cuts due to COVID 
One in five physicians reported having a pay cut during the COVID-19 pandemic. The majority of the monetary loss was a result of low volume of patients and lack of elective surgeries.

Compared to foreign countries
The United States has the highest paid general practitioners in the world.  The US has the second-highest paid specialists in the world behind the Netherlands. Public and private payers pay higher fees to US primary care physicians for office visits (overall 27 percent more for public and 70 percent more for private) than in Australia, Canada, France, Germany and the United Kingdom. US primary care physicians also earn more (overall earning $186,000 yearly) than the foreign counterparts, with even higher numbers for physician compensation for medical specialists. Higher fees, rather than factors such as higher practice costs, volume of services, or tuition expenses, mainly drive higher US spending.

Variations within the US

A survey of 15,000 physicians practicing in the United States reported that, across all specialties, male physicians earn approximately 41% more than female physicians. Also, female physicians are more likely to report working fewer hours than their male counterparts.

The same survey reported that, the highest-earning physicians were located in North Central region, comprising Kansas, Nebraska, North and South Dakota, Iowa, and Missouri, with a median salary of $225,000 per year, as per 2010. The next highest earning physicians were those in the South Central region, comprising Texas, Oklahoma, and Arkansas, at $216,000. Those physicians reporting the lowest compensation levels were located in the Northeast and Southwest, earning an across-specialty median annual income of $190,000.

The survey concluded that physicians in small cities (50,000–100,000) earned slightly more than those living in community types of other sizes, ranging from metropolitan to rural, but the differences were only marginal (a few percent more or less).

Other results from the survey were that those running a solo practice earned marginally less than private practice employees, who, in turn, earned marginally less than hospital employees.

In contrast, the Bureau of Labor Statistics reports median annual income for physicians at $166,400.

Medical education
The US medical education for physicians includes participation in a US medical school that eventually grants a US form of Doctor of Medicine (M.D.) degree or a Doctor of Osteopathic Medicine degree. During the process of  medical school, physicians who wish to practice in the U.S. must take standardized exams, such as the United States Medical Licensing Examination steps 1, 2 and 3 or Comprehensive Osteopathic Medical Licensing Examination Level 1, 2, and 3.

In addition, the completion of a residency is required to practice independently. Residency is accredited by the ACGME and is the same regardless of degree type. After residency, physicians can become board certified by their specialty board. Physicians must have a medical license to practice in any state.

See also

Health policy
Health workforce
Healthcare in the United States
Medical deserts in the United States
Medical education in the United States
Physician shortage in the United States
Primary care service area

References